Elavunkal Joseph Philip (13 June 1926 – 13 June 1987), popularly known by his pen name Kanam EJ, was a Malayalam novelist, short story writer, and lyricist. Along with his contemporary, Muttathu Varkey, he was known for a genre of sentiment-filled romantic fiction known as painkili (janapriya) novel in Malayalam literature, written with the common man in mind. Philip started the well known Malayalam weekly Manorajyam and served as its editor.

Early life and career
Philip was born on 13 June 1926 as the son of Elavunkal Joseph in Kanam, a small village in Kottayam district of Kerala. He attended MHSS Kangazha and passed Malayalam Higher. After schooling he joined military service. He return to Kottayam after the military service and joined CMS Middle School Kanam, as a teacher. Later he served as Malayalam Pandit in CMS schools of Mundakayam, Kumpalampoika, Punnavely and Kottayam. Philip quit teaching and joined the popular Malayalam Weekly Malayala Manorama as a journalist. In 1967 he resigned from Malayala Manorama and started his own Malayalam Weekly called Manorajyam. He later sold it to George Thomas of Keraladwani.

Literary career
Kanam emerged as one of the popular writers of Malayalam fiction during the 1960s and 1970s. He mainly wrote social novels based on the Christian community of Kerala. He was a prolific writer and has written about 100 novels. Almost all of his novels were published in serial installments (Neendakatha) in Malayala Manorama Weekly. One of his novels, Bharya, was adapted into a Malayalam film with the same title. The 1962 film was directed by Kunchacko and starring Sathyan and Ragini. Kanam also wrote lyrics to few Malayalam films.

Death
Kanam died on his 61st birthday in 1987.

Selected works
Pampanathi Panjozhukunnu
Ee Arayekkar Nintethanu
Nee Bhoomiyude Uppakunnu
Bharthavu
Bharya
Adhyapika
Kaattumaram

References

External links

 
 

1926 births
1987 deaths
Malayalam-language writers
Indian male novelists
Malayalam novelists
Malayalam-language lyricists
20th-century Indian novelists
People from Kottayam district
Novelists from Kerala
20th-century Indian male writers